Vincent Valentine (born February 23, 1994) is a former American football defensive tackle. He was drafted by the New England Patriots in the third round of the 2016 NFL Draft. He played college football at Nebraska.

Professional career

New England Patriots
Valentine was drafted by the Patriots in the third round, 96th overall, in the 2016 NFL Draft. Valentine entered training camp competing to be a backup defensive tackle with Markus Kuhn, Woodrow Hamilton, Joe Vellano, and Anthony Johnson. He won the backup job and began the regular season as the Patriot's primary backup defensive tackle behind veteran starting defensive tackles Malcom Brown and Alan Branch.

Valentine made his professional debut in the season opener against the Arizona Cardinals, where he recorded his first career sack against quarterback Carson Palmer.

On February 5, 2017, Valentine was part of the Patriots team that won Super Bowl LI. In the game, the Patriots defeated the Atlanta Falcons by a score of 34–28 in overtime.

On September 22, 2017, the Patriots placed Valentine on injured reserve after dealing with a knee injury. The Patriots made it to Super Bowl LII without Valentine, but lost 41-33 to the Philadelphia Eagles.  

On September 1, 2018, Valentine was waived by the Patriots and was signed to the practice squad the next day. He was released on October 8, 2018.

Arizona Cardinals
On October 31, 2018, Valentine was signed to the Arizona Cardinals practice squad. He was released on November 27, 2018.

Seattle Seahawks
On December 4, 2018, Valentine was signed to the Seattle Seahawks practice squad after a tryout the previous day.

Arizona Cardinals (second stint)
On December 11, 2018, Valentine was signed by the Arizona Cardinals off the Seahawks practice squad. He was waived/injured on August 7, and reverted to injured reserve after clearing waivers on August 8. He was waived from injured reserve on August 30, 2019.

Personal life
In college, he was a journalism major, and earned a spot on the Nebraska Scholar-Athlete Honor Roll in the spring of 2013. Valentine also volunteered his time with Uplifting Athletes and part of team hospital visits while with the Huskers.

References

External links
New England Patriots bio
Nebraska Cornhuskers bio

1994 births
Living people
American football defensive tackles
Arizona Cardinals players
Nebraska Cornhuskers football players
New England Patriots players
People from Edwardsville, Illinois
Players of American football from Illinois
Seattle Seahawks players
Sportspeople from Greater St. Louis